Rocas do Vouga is a freguesia in Sever do Vouga, Aveiro District, Portugal. The population in 2011 was 1,778, in an area of 14.82 km2.

References

Freguesias of Sever do Vouga